A multipolar neuron is a type of neuron that possesses a single axon and many dendrites (and dendritic branches), allowing for the integration of a great deal of information from other neurons. These processes are projections from the neuron cell body. Multipolar neurons constitute the majority of neurons in the central nervous system. They include motor neurons and interneurons/relaying neurons are most commonly found in the cortex of the brain and the spinal cord. Peripherally, multipolar neurons are found in autonomic ganglia.

See also
 Dogiel cells
 Ganglion cell
 Purkinje cell
 Pyramidal cell

Additional images

References

External links
 Diagram
 Diagram
 Image

Central nervous system neurons